Siupeli Malamala (born January 15, 1969) is a former professional American football offensive lineman. He played offensive tackle and offensive guard in the NFL for the New York Jets from 1992–1999. He played in 62 games throughout his professional career.

High school and college career
Malamala lived in Tonga until the age of 14, when he moved to Hawaii. He attended Kalaheo High School in Kailua, O'ahu before matriculating at the University of Washington.

Post-NFL career
He now coaches Offensive and Defensive Line at The Benjamin School in Palm Beach Gardens, Florida.

References

Tongan players of American football
1969 births
Living people
University of Washington alumni
Washington Huskies football players
New York Jets players
American football offensive linemen
Tongan emigrants to the United States
Ed Block Courage Award recipients